Tyson Fury vs Derek Chisora III was a professional boxing match contested between WBC and Lineal heavyweight champion, Tyson Fury, and WBA International heavyweight champion, Derek Chisora, that took place on 3 December 2022 at the Tottenham Hotspur Stadium, with Fury winning by technical knockout in the tenth round.

Background 
Fury and Chisora first fought in 2011, with Chisora defending his British and Commonwealth titles at Wembley Arena, both men went into the fight with a record of 14–0. Fury won by unanimous decision with scores of 117–112, 117–112, and 118–111.
Fury and Chisora fought for a second time in 2014, with Chisora defending his European and WBO International titles at the ExCel, with Fury winning by corner retirement in the tenth round.

On 20 October 2022, it was announced that Fury and Chisora would fight in a trilogy bout on 3 December at the Tottenham Hotspur Stadium in London, live on BT Sport Box Office.

The fight 
Most commentators concluded that Fury was dominant throughout the fight. The referee stopped the fight in the tenth round after concluding that Chisora was unable to defend himself effectively. This led to Fury's victory via a TKO. Chisora also received praise for being "tough" and for standing up to Fury.

Fight card 

<small>

Broadcasting

References 

Boxing matches
2022 in boxing
2022 in British sport
December 2022 sports events in the United Kingdom
2022 sports events in London
Boxing matches involving Tyson Fury
World Boxing Council heavyweight championship matches
Boxing in London